Jeffrey "Mantas" Dunn (born 22 April 1961) is a British guitarist best known as one of the founding members of thrash/speed metal band Venom, with which he played as a guitarist from 1979 to 1985 and 1989 to 2002. He currently plays in Venom Inc. alongside fellow former Venom member bassist/vocalist Tony Dolan and drummer Jeramie Kling.

Career after Venom 
In 1986, Dunn left Venom to form the band Mantas which has recorded two full-length albums, Winds of Change in 1988 and Zero Tolerance in 2004. In 1992, he played guitars for Warfare, a NWOBHM band from the United Kingdom.

In 2006, Mantas toured with German hardcore techno act Scooter in Germany as an additional member on guitar. In 2007, he worked with the band Dryll. In 2009, he guested on German metalcore band Last One Dying's debut album The Hour of Lead and released the Dryll EP Digital Surgery which was available at live shows only.

In 2010, Dunn and former Venom members Antony "Antton" Lant (drums; brother of Venom frontman Conrad "Cronos" Lant) and Tony "Demolition Man" Dolan (bass, vocals) formed a band, initially called Primevil and then M-pire of Evil. 
In 2015, the Venom '89/'90 line-up of Dunn, Dolan and Bray reunited for a concert at the Keep It True festival in Germany, which was the start of what became the band Venom Inc., which released the album Avé in 2017 and toured extensively. The year after, Bray was replaced by Kling.

In May 2018, Dunn underwent emergency heart surgery (double bypass) in Lisbon following a life-threatening incident.

Dunn played guitar on the track "Hold On" by Scott Michael Cavagan (2019).

When the COVID-19 pandemic broke out in early 2020, Dunn became active on the social media platform Facebook, releasing tutorial videos of how to play many Venom and Venom Inc. songs. This later developed into livestreams, usually twice a week (Monday and Friday nights), first on his private Facebook page, later on his official Jeff Mantas Dunn page. These livestreams transmissions are referred to as "GRTV", an in-joke that started off due to a glitch that repeatedly stated "Gareth Richards is watching".

In February 2021, Dunn launched a Jeff Mantas page on Patreon. 25% of the profits goes to a local cat and dog sanctuary and his own cat sanctuary, both in Portugal, where Dunn currently resides.

Equipment
 CSL Flying V
 Ibanez Roadstar with Hardrock'r tremolo system
 Ibanez RG (Black Finish)
 Ibanez RG (Blue Finish)
 Ibanez Xiphos (Black Finish)
 Steinberger Synapse (Black Finish)
Ibanez Destroyer DT 555 (Black Finish with White Pickups)
Mantas now uses Caparison guitars.

Discography

With Venom
 Welcome to Hell (1981)
 Black Metal (1982)
 At War with Satan (1984) (chart position #64 UK, #48 SE)
 Possessed (1985) (chart position #99 UK)
 Eine Kleine Nachtmusik (double live album) (1986)
 Prime Evil (1989)
 Tear Your Soul Apart (EP) (1990)
 Temples of Ice (1991)
 The Waste Lands (1992)
 Venom '96 (EP) (1996)
 Cast in Stone (1997)
 Resurrection (2000)

With Mantas
 Winds of Change (1988)
 Deceiver (single, 1988)
 Zero Tolerance (2004)

With Dryll
 Digital Surgery (EP, 2009)

With M-pire of Evil
 Creatures of the Black (EP, 2011)
 Hell to the Holy (2012)
 Crucified (2013)

With Venom Inc.
 Avé (2017)
 There's Only Black (2022)

With Warfare (as guest)
 Noise, Filth and Fury (EP, 1984)
 Pure Filth (1984)
 A Conflict of Hatred (1988)

With The Mugshots (as guest)
 Children of the Night / The Call (maxi single, 2021)

References

External links
MANTAS Solo projects

Living people
Black metal musicians
British heavy metal guitarists
1961 births